Platte City is a city in and the county seat of Platte County, Missouri within the United States. The population was 4,691 at the 2010 census. The city is part of the Kansas City metropolitan area.

History 

Platte City was founded by Zadock "Zed" Martin and was incorporated as a city in September 1843.

On December 16, 1861, Colonel W. James Morgan's Union Squad razed Platte City, including the courthouse.

The Platte County Fair held annually just outside Platte City began in 1863 and is the oldest continuously operating fair west of the Mississippi River.

On April 3, 1882, Jesse James planned a robbery of the Platte City bank, but it was never carried out due to his assassination by Robert Ford on the morning of the raid.

On July 19, 1933 Bonnie and Clyde were ambushed by, and engaged in, a shootout with local authorities just south of Platte City at the Red Crown Tourist Court.

The Frederick Krause Mansion and Platte County Courthouse are listed on the National Register of Historic Places.

Geography
Platte City is located along the south side of the Platte River and the Platte Falls Conservation Area lies to the northeast along the flood plain. I-29 passes the east side of the city and Missouri Route 92 serves the city. Tracy lies on the north side of the river flood plain.

Demographics

2010 census
As of the census of 2010, there were 4,691 people, 1,975 households, and 1,174 families living in the city. The racial makeup of the city was 88.9% White, 4.6% African American, 0.5% Native American, 1.4% Asian, 0.2% Pacific Islander, 1.6% from other races, and 2.9% from two or more races. Hispanic or Latino of any race were 4.9% of the population.

There were 1,975 households, of which 32.5% had children under the age of 18 living with them, 41.7% were married couples living together, 12.9% had a female householder with no husband present, 4.9% had a male householder with no wife present, and 40.6% were non-families. 34.9% of all households were made up of individuals, and 9.3% had someone living alone who was 65 years of age or older. The average household size was 2.29 and the average family size was 2.97.

The median age in the city was 35.2 years. 24.2% of residents were under the age of 18; 9.3% were between the ages of 18 and 24; 31.3% were from 25 to 44; 23.6% were from 45 to 64; and 11.6% were 65 years of age or older. The gender makeup of the city was 50.4% male and 49.6% female.

2000 census
As of the census of 2000, there were 3,866 people, 1,486 households, and 1,017 families living in the city. The population density was 1,147.2 people per square mile (442.9/km). There were 1,569 housing units at an average density of 465.6 per square mile (179.8/km). The racial makeup of the city was 92.08% White, 3.34% African American, 0.49% Native American, 0.80% Asian, 1.16% from other races, and 2.12% from two or more races. Hispanic or Latino of any race were 2.79% of the population.

There were 1,486 households, out of which 37.1% had children under the age of 18 living with them, 51.7% were married couples living together, 12.5% had a female householder with no husband present, and 31.5% were non-families. 25.7% of all households were made up of individuals, and 6.7% had someone living alone who was 65 years of age or older. The average household size was 2.48 and the average family size was 2.99.

In the city, the population was spread out, with 27.1% under the age of 18, 8.8% from 18 to 24, 34.6% from 25 to 44, 19.3% from 45 to 64, and 10.1% who were 65 years of age or older. The median age was 33 years. For every 100 females, there were 99.1 males. For every 100 females age 18 and over, there were 94.4 males.

The median income for a household in the city was $46,379, and the median income for a family was $52,548. Males had a median income of $36,563 versus $26,169 for females. The per capita income for the city was $20,288. About 4.8% of families and 6.2% of the population were below the poverty line, including 8.0% of those under age 18 and 9.2% of those age 65 or over.

Education 
Platte County R-3 School District operates three elementary schools, two middle schools and Platte County High School.

Platte City has a public library, a branch of the Mid-Continent Public Library.

Transportation 
Platte City is accessible via Interstate 29 at exit 18.

References

External links
 Platte City
 Historic maps of Platte City in the Sanborn Maps of Missouri Collection at the University of Missouri

Cities in Platte County, Missouri
County seats in Missouri
1843 establishments in Missouri
Cities in Missouri